Melodifestivalen 2004 was the selection for the 44th song to represent Sweden at the Eurovision Song Contest. It was the 43rd time that this system of picking a song had been used. Five heats had taken place to select the ten songs for the final, in Karlstad, Gothenburg, Umeå, Malmö and a Second Chance round in Stockholm. The final was broadcast on SVT1 and Sveriges Radio's P4 network. The winner was Lena Philipsson with "Det gör ont" who later that year came in 5th place in Eurovision Song Contest 2004 in Turkey with the English-language version It Hurts.

Heats
The heats for Melodifestivalen 2004 began on 21 February 2004. Ten songs from these heats qualified for the final on March 20, 2004. This was the third year that a heat format had been used for the competition.

Heat 1

Heat 2

Heat 3

Heat 4

Second Chance Round

Finals

Juries

Televotes

Returning artists

See also
Eurovision Song Contest 2004
Sweden in the Eurovision Song Contest
Sweden in the Eurovision Song Contest 2004

External links
Melodifestivalen at SVT's open archive
Poplight.se: Melodifestivalen 2004 (in Swedish)

2004 in Swedish music
2004 Swedish television seasons
2004
Eurovision Song Contest 2004
2004 song contests
February 2004 events in Europe
March 2004 events in Europe
2000s in Stockholm
2000s in Gothenburg
2000s in Malmö
Events in Stockholm
Events in Gothenburg
Events in Malmö
Events in Karlstad
Events in Luleå